Jacques Faty (born 25 February 1984) is a former professional footballer who played as a central defender. Born in France, he represented Senegal at international level.

Club career

Rennes
Born in Villeneuve-Saint-Georges, Val-de-Marne, Faty was coached at the well-known Clairefontaine Youth Centre before joining Rennes as a youth in 2001, signing on professional terms in 2002. He became an integral part of the 2003–04 Rennes team which historically achieved qualification to the UEFA Cup.

Faty started to lose his place in the team following the arrival of Ghanaian John Mensah early in 2006. The departure of coach László Bölöni to manage AS Monaco did not help his claim either. Pierre Dréossi came in to fill in the vacant coach's position and used Grégory Bourillon and Mensah as the main central defence partnership for the 2006–07 season.

Faty became more and more unsettled as the season went on, and in October 2006 his patience run out. Faty announced his desire to leave the club when his contract was due to expire in June 2007. A knee injury to Mensah gave him a run in the side, and to his credit, he put in some decent performances, finishing with 24 games in the season. The Rennes management tried to keep him at the club by giving him an extension to his contract, but he declined and opted to join Marseille and enjoy a new experience at "France's top club" as he said when he signed his contract.

Marseille
Faty's stay at Marseille was short-lived. After experiencing the highs of UEFA Champions League and Europa League competition, he was unable to break the first team with only nine appearances.

Sochaux
He moved on to fellow Ligue 1 team FC Sochaux where he spent three seasons.

Sivasspor
He left Sochaux for Turkish Süper Lig club Sivasspor.
  
Faty returned to Ligue 1 when he was loaned to Bastia from Sivasspor in January 2013.

Wuhan Zall
Following this, he moved to the Chinese Super League with Wuhan Zall in mid-2013.

Stints in Australia
On 11 January 2015, he signed for Australian side Sydney FC for the rest of the season, becoming the second player acquired by the club in the transfer window, being an injury replacement for vice-captain. Sasa Ognenovski. On 11 April 2016, Faty was released from his contract by mutual consent.

On the same day of his release, Faty agreed to a one-year deal with the Central Coast Mariners.

International career
Faty is an accomplished player in the youth level of international football.

In 2001, he captained France's FIFA U-17 World Championship squad to a first-place finish. Faty was a regular starter of the French U-21 international squad. He took part in the 2006 UEFA European Under-21 Football Championship held in Portugal where the French finished as losing semi-finalists. He is no longer available for selection after exceeding the age limit.

Faty made his international debut for the Senegal national team on 26 August 2009.

Style of play
Faty's primary position is central defence but he has also been fielded in midfield.

Personal life
Faty was born in France to a Senegalese father and Cape Verdean mother, he is a practising Muslim. He is the elder brother of fellow footballer Ricardo Faty and is the cousin of former Mariners teammate Mickaël Tavares.

Career statistics

Club

References

External links

 Jacques Faty's profile, stats & pics
 
 Sivasspor was Jacques Faty Transfer 

1984 births
Living people
French Muslims
French footballers
Sportspeople from Villeneuve-Saint-Georges
Association football central defenders
Citizens of Senegal through descent
Senegalese Muslims
Senegalese footballers
Senegal international footballers
France youth international footballers
France under-21 international footballers
Ligue 1 players
Süper Lig players
Chinese Super League players
China League One players
A-League Men players
INF Clairefontaine players
Stade Rennais F.C. players
Olympique de Marseille players
FC Sochaux-Montbéliard players
Sivasspor footballers
SC Bastia players
Wuhan F.C. players
Sydney FC players
Central Coast Mariners FC players
Senegalese people of Cape Verdean descent
French sportspeople of Senegalese descent
French sportspeople of Cape Verdean descent
Senegalese expatriate footballers
Expatriate footballers in Turkey
Expatriate footballers in China
Expatriate soccer players in Australia
2012 Africa Cup of Nations players
Footballers from Val-de-Marne